KPDB (98.3 FM) was a radio station broadcasting a Spanish music format. Formerly licensed to Big Lake, Texas, United States, the station served the San Angelo area.  The station was owned by Centro Cristiano De Fe.

History 
On January 22, 2003, the station was sold to Centro Cristiano De Fe.

The station's license was cancelled by the Federal Communications Commission on August 1, 2013 for failure to file an application for renewal.

References

External links
 

PDB
Defunct radio stations in the United States
Radio stations disestablished in 2013
PDB
2013 disestablishments in Texas
PDB